Shayengan (also Romanized as Shāyengān; also known as Shānīgān, Shāyegān, and Shingan) is a village in Dowlatabad Rural District, in the Central District of Ravansar County, Kermanshah Province, Iran. At the 2006 census, its population was 167, in 38 families.

References 

Populated places in Ravansar County